Edward Carson (17 February 1920 – 6 March 1987) was a British Conservative politician.

Personal life
The Hon. Edward Carson was the youngest child of Lord Carson's five children (born when his father was 66), and he was the only child of his father's second wife Lucy Frewen.

Carson married Heather, daughter of Frank Arthur Sclater, O.B.E., M.C., of Milford, Surrey, in 1943; their son, Edward Rory Carson, married Araminta, daughter of Sir John James MacDonald Horlick, 5th Baronet, in 1975.

Edward Carson was educated at Ludgrove School and then Eton College – as was his son (a barrister who lives in Henley-upon-Thames) and two of his grandsons – and at Trinity Hall, Cambridge.

Member of Parliament
Carson was the Member of Parliament (MP) for the Isle of Thanet from 1945, when aged 25, until he resigned from the House of Commons for health reasons in 1953. He died in March 1987 at the age of 67.

References

External links 
 

1920 births
1987 deaths
People educated at Eton College
Alumni of Trinity Hall, Cambridge
Conservative Party (UK) MPs for English constituencies
Sons of life peers
UK MPs 1945–1950
UK MPs 1950–1951
UK MPs 1951–1955
People educated at Ludgrove School